The Proteo-phage-1 RNA motif is a conserved RNA structure that was discovered by bioinformatics.
Energetically stable tetraloops often occur in this motif.

Proteo-phage-1 motif RNAs are found in Pseudomonadota. Nearby to most Proteo-phage-1 motif RNAs are genes that are typical of phages. This, in turn, suggests that Proteo-phage-1 motif RNAs are found in prophages, and presumably also used by phage particles, although Proteo-phage-1 motif RNAs have not been observed in genome sequences of purified phages.
It is ambiguous whether Proteo-phage-1 RNAs function as cis-regulatory elements or whether they operate in trans.

References

Non-coding RNA